Sthamer is a German surname.

People with the surname 

 Friedrich Sthamer (1856–1931), German diplomat
 Nadja Sthamer (born 1990), German politician

See also 

 Starmer (surname)
 Stahmer
 Stamer

Surnames
Surnames of German origin